Soak is the tenth studio album by Foetus, released on October 15, 2013, by Ectopic Ents. It acts as the satellite album for the 2010 album Hide.

Track listing

Personnel
Musicians
Jeff Davidson – drums (1)
Foetus (J. G. Thirlwell) – vocals, instruments, producer, photography, design
Abby Fischer – additional vocals (3, 10)
Natalie Galpern – additional vocals (2, 6, 9, 11)
Elliot Hoffman – drums (10)
Jason Schimmel – remixing (10)
Trey Spruance – remixing (10)
Technical personnel
Al Carlson – additional mixing (1, 2, 5, 6, 9)
Heung-Heung Chin – art direction
Scott Hull – mastering

Release history

References

2013 albums
Foetus (band) albums
Albums produced by JG Thirlwell